

A
Al Arabi

B
Burgan

F
Al-Fahaheel

J
Al Jahra

K
Kazma
Khaitan
Kuwait SC

N
Al-Nasr

S
Sahel
Al Salibikhaet
Al Salmiya
Al Shabab

Q
Qadsia SC
Al Qurain (not yet playing)

T
Al Tadhamon SC

Y
Al Yarmouk

Kuwait
 
Football clubs
Football clubs